Marlon Alirio Pérez Arango (born 10 January 1976) is a Colombian former professional road bicycle racer. Pérez previously rode for UCI ProTour team .

Major results

1994
 1st  Points race, UCI Junior Track World Championships
1996
 1st  Time trial, National Road Championships
 1st  Team pursuit, Pan American Track Championships
1997
 1st  Overall 
 2nd Time trial, National Under-23 Road Championships
1998
 1st   Time trial, Central American and Caribbean Games
 National Under-23 Road Championships
1st  Road race
1st  Time trial
 1st  Overall Vuelta de la Juventud de Colombia
1999
 Pan American Games
1st  Points race
3rd  Individual pursuit
 National Road Championships
1st  Time trial
2nd Road race
 1st  Overall 
 1st Prologue & Stage 9 Clásico RCN
 3rd Overall Vuelta del Uruguay
1st Stage 4
2000
 1st  Overall Points race, UCI Track World Cup
1st  Points race, Cali
3rd  Points race, Turin
 Pan American Track Championships
1st  Team pursuit
3rd  Points race
 1st  Overall Tour Nord-Isère
1st Stages 1, 2 & 3
 1st Seraing-Aachen-Seraing
 1st Stage 7 (ITT) Vuelta a Colombia
 2nd Overall 
 7th Druivenkoers-Overijse
2001
 1st  Time trial, National Road Championships
 10th Overall Vuelta a Colombia
1st Prologue & Stages 1 & 2 (TTT)
2002
 1st Prologue & Stage 1 Vuelta a Colombia
 1st Stages 1 & 2 Vuelta a Boyacá
 2nd Time trial, National Road Championships
2003
 1st Stage 1 Clásico RCN
 2nd Trophée des Grimpeurs
 3rd Overall 
1st Stage 2 (ITT)
 3rd Overall Vuelta a Cundinamarca
 7th Overall Vuelta a la Rioja
2004
 1st Stages 1, 3 & 14 Vuelta al Táchira
 3rd Trofeo dell'Etna
 7th Overall Tour de Langkawi
1st Stage 2
 9th GP Fred Mengoni
2005
 1st Stages 4 & 10a (ITT) Vuelta a Venezuela
 1st Stage 3 (ITT) 
 7th Overall Tour de Langkawi
2007
 6th Tre Valli Varesine
2008
 8th Overall Tour du Poitou-Charentes
2010
 1st Stages 1 (TTT), 3, 5 (ITT), 6 & 8 Clásico RCN
 1st Stages 4 & 5 (ITT) 
 1st Stage 4 
 1st Stage 3 
 1st Prologue (TTT) 
2011
 1st  Time trial, Pan American Games
 1st Stage 1 (ITT) Vuelta a Colombia
 1st Prologue Clásico RCN
2012
 1st Stages 3 (ITT) & 9 Vuelta a Costa Rica
 2nd Time trial, National Road Championships

Grand Tour general classification results timeline

References

External links
 
 
 
 
 
 
 

1976 births
Living people
Colombian male cyclists
Colombian track cyclists
Olympic cyclists of Colombia
Cyclists at the 1996 Summer Olympics
Cyclists at the 2000 Summer Olympics
Cyclists at the 2004 Summer Olympics
Pan American Games medalists in cycling
Pan American Games gold medalists for Colombia
Cyclists at the 1999 Pan American Games
Cyclists at the 2011 Pan American Games
Medalists at the 2011 Pan American Games
Central American and Caribbean Games medalists in cycling
Central American and Caribbean Games gold medalists for Colombia
Competitors at the 1998 Central American and Caribbean Games
Sportspeople from Antioquia Department
20th-century Colombian people
21st-century Colombian people